Raquel Kops-Jones and Abigail Spears were the defending champions, but lost in the first round to Jelena Janković and Katarina Srebotnik.
Cara Black and Sania Mirza won the title, defeating Chan Hao-ching and Liezel Huber in the final, 4–6, 6–0, [11–9].

Seeds

Draw

Draw

References
 Main Draw

2013 Doubles
Toray Pan Pacific Open - Doubles
2013 Toray Pan Pacific Open